Rory is an American pop punk band from Altamonte Springs, Florida. They are signed to One Eleven Records.

History

Since Rory's inception in 1998, they have released an EP and a full length. They signed to One Eleven Records in early 2004. Their most recent release, We're Up to No Good, We're Up to No Good was produced by John Avila of Oingo Boingo fame, and Mark Hoppus of Blink-182/+44 fame. It was released September 12, 2006. 

The band toured nationally and has shared the stage with the likes of Fall Out Boy, Less Than Jake, The Spill Canvas, Self Against City, This Day & Age, Rookie of the Year, and more.

Discography

Studio albums
 We're Up to No Good, We're Up to No Good (2006), One Eleven Records

EPs
 Always Right As In We Are  (2004), One Eleven Records

Compilation appearances
 Drive-Thru Records And Purevolume.com Compilation (2005) ("Deja Vroom)" - on disc one. Drive-Thru Records
 Punk The Clock Vol. 2 (2005) ("Deja Vroom)" DCide Records

Videography
 "This Could've Been A Dance Dance Revolution, But Now It's Just A Dance" (2004)
 "Deja Vroomier" (2006)
 "Kind Of Like Chloroformity" (2006)
 "Tonight I Don't Care, I'm Having Candy For Dinner" (2006)
 "Nice Planet, We'll Take It" (2006)

External links

Rory profile on AbsolutePunk.net

Musical groups established in 1998
Musical groups from Florida